INS Akshay may refer to the following vessels of the Indian Navy:

 , an  completed in 1962 and given to Bangladesh in 1973 where she served as BNS Padma
 , an  commissioned in 1990

Indian Navy ship names